Rebuild may refer to:

Music

Albums
 Rebuild (The Letter Black album), a 2013 album by The Letter Black
 Rebuild, a 2005 album by Verse

Songs
 "Rebuild" (song), by Matt Thiessen from Relient K, Dustin Ruth and Switchfoot
 "Rebuild", a song by Son Lux, composed by Ryan Lott, from We Are Rising

Other
 Rebuild, a 2014 Green Lantern Corps comic book by Robert Venditti, DC Comics
 "Rebuild", a 2014 episode of Mistresses with Alyssa Milano

See also 
 Rebuild of Evangelion, a 2007 Japanese animated film series
 Build. Destroy. Rebuild., album by Hanni El Khatib
 Remanufacturing
 Refurbishment (disambiguation)